Ecuador Time (ECT), as named by the IANA time zone database, is the time observed in mainland Ecuador since 1931. Ecuador Time is at UTC-05:00 and has no daylight saving, except for a brief period in the 1990s during the government of president Sixto Durán Ballén.
This means Ecuador without Galápagos Province, which observed Ecuador Time until 1986, when it switched to Galápagos Time (GALT), at UTC-06:00.

References